Live at the O2 Arena + Rarities is the third live album by the American rock band Alter Bridge. Recorded on November 24, 2016, at The O2 Arena in London, England, during the tour for 2016's The Last Hero, the album also features a disc of tracks initially released as bonus tracks on special editions of previous studio albums, as well as two previously unreleased songs that were recorded in 2004. It was released by Napalm Records on September 8, 2017.

Background
The live portion of Live at the O2 Arena + Rarities was recorded during the promotional tour for Alter Bridge's fifth studio album The Last Hero on November 24, 2016 at The O2 Arena in London, England. The show was described by Blabbermouth.net as "One of the biggest moments of the band's career", and by Chad Childers of Loudwire as "one of their biggest shows in [the band's] history". The live portion is on the album's first and second discs. The Rarities portion includes nine songs that were previously featured as bonus tracks on special editions or regional releases of the band's studio albums, plus two previously unreleased tracks from the One Day Remains sessions: "Cruel Sun" and "Solace". The deluxe edition of the album also features a documentary including interviews with the band members, their crew, and their families, as well as behind-the-scenes footage of the show.

Track listing

Personnel
Myles Kennedy – lead vocals, rhythm guitar, lead guitar
Mark Tremonti – lead guitar, rhythm guitar, backing vocals, lead vocals
Brian Marshall – bass
Scott Phillips – drums

Charts

Notes
 Bonus tracks "Poison In Your Veins" and "My Champion" were recorded on November 23, 2016 at Manchester Arena. 

 "Never Say Die" was incorrectly listed as "Outright" on early pressings of Fortress. On Live at the O2 Arena + Rarities it is listed as "Never Say Die (Outright)". It is not a cover of the Black Sabbath piece of the same name.

 Similarly, "Symphony of Agony" was incorrectly listed as "Last of Our Kind" on The Last Hero, and is likewise here listed as "Symphony of Agony (Last of Our Kind)".

References

2017 live albums
Alter Bridge albums
Napalm Records live albums